Ivan Borisov may refer to:

 Ivan Borisov (alpine skier) (born 1979), Kyrgyzstani alpine skier
 Ivan Dmitriyevich Borisov (1913–1939), Soviet Winter War pilot and Hero of the Soviet Union
 Ivan Grigorevich Borisov (1921–1954), Soviet World War II fighter pilot and Hero of the Soviet Union